The 21st Senate of Puerto Rico was the upper house of the 13th Legislative Assembly of Puerto Rico that met from January 2, 1997, to January 1, 2001. All members were elected in the General Elections of 1996. The Senate had a majority of members from the New Progressive Party (PNP).

The body is counterparted by the 25th House of Representatives of Puerto Rico in the lower house.

Leadership

Members

Membership

References

External links
Elections result on CEEPUR

22
1997 in Puerto Rico
1998 in Puerto Rico
1999 in Puerto Rico
2000 in Puerto Rico
2001 in Puerto Rico